Beau Young, popularly known as Beau Young Prince, is an American rapper from Washington D.C, signed to Def Jam Recordings. He burst on the national scene in 2018 with a hit single "Kill Moe," and received a Grammy nomination for his song "Let Go", which was featured on the Spider-Man: Into the Spider-Verse soundtrack and went  multi-Platinum.

Music career
Beau Young Prince's first hit single, "Kill Moe", was released in 2018 a few months after he signed on to Def Jam Records. Reviewer Jackson Howard of Pitchfork criticized the song's uninspired lyrics but praised his vocal style describing it as "believable and genuine", nonetheless. Along with Spider-Man: Into the Spider-Verse, his songs were also featured in Coming 2 America and The Hate You Give.
In 2019, his single "Let Go" peaked number 4 on the Billboard charts.

Discography

Singles

Awards and nominations

References 

Year of birth missing (living people)
Living people
American rappers
Def Jam Recordings artists